The North American Conference on Chinese Linguistics (NACCL) is an annual academic conference that focuses on research in Chinese language and linguistics.

History
The conference was first held in 1989 at Ohio State University, as the Northeast Conference on Chinese Linguistics (NECCL), and changed its name to "North American Conference on Chinese Linguistics" at its third annual session in 1991.  It is held every year in late spring, and includes both theoretical and empirical research from all subfields of Chinese linguistics; presenters include graduate students in addition to professors and other well-established scholars.  The conference generally hosts talks both in Chinese and in English.  The proceedings are published annually after the conference is finished; after NACCL-20 in 2008, the proceedings were published online for the first time.

Subjects
Subjects presented include: Sociolinguistics, Phonetics/Phonology, Syntax, Semantics, Pragmatics, Orthography, Historical linguistics, Computational/Corpus Linguistics, Language Acquisition, Psycholinguistics, and Morphology.

Past conferences

See also
List of linguistics conferences

References

Linguistics conferences
Sinology